In Greek mythology, the Messapian shepherds are the flock-tending inhabitants of Messapia (Northern Apulia), a region in Italy. They feature in two similar myths, where they offend local nymphs and are punished by them for their impiousness.

Mythology

Shepherd 
In one myth, nymphs, companions of Pan, lived in Messapia. A shepherd frightened them, and then proceeded to mock them by mimicking their dance with loutish leaps, crude shouts and rustic insults. He would not stop until they turned him into a wild olive tree, whose bitter berries bear his sourness to this day.

Group of shepherds 
In another myth, some Messapian shepherds declared themselves better dancers than the Epimelides nymphs (nymphs that tend to the flocks), not realizing they were goddesses. The shepherds and the nymphs then got into a dancing competition. The shepherds danced in an artless manner, while the movements of the nymphs were full of grace and beauty. Naturally the nymphs won, and revealed their identities to the shepherds. For punishment, they turned them into trees, which still lament and groan to this day.

See also 

 Arachne
 Marsyas
 Pierides

References

Bibliography 
 Antoninus Liberalis, The Metamorphoses of Antoninus Liberalis translated by Francis Celoria (Routledge 1992). Online version at the Topos Text Project.
 
 

Shepherds
Metamorphoses into trees in Greek mythology
Italic mythology
Metamorphoses characters